The Confiscation of Alcohol (Young Persons) Act 1997 is an Act of the Parliament of the United Kingdom. The purpose of the Act was to empower police officers to confiscate alcohol from the possession of any minors under the age of 18. Previously only the purchase of alcohol was illegal by minors, and officers could take no action against a minor in possession of alcohol unless they were committing another offence. The Act was introduced to close this loophole and allow officers to seize alcohol in a minor's possession and create an offence for any person who fails to comply with a request to confiscate. The Act can also be applied to a person over 18 if the officer believes that the person intends to supply a minor with alcohol in their possession.

The Act only applies in England, Wales and Northern Ireland.

External links
 Text of the Act

United Kingdom Acts of Parliament 1997
Alcohol law in the United Kingdom